Kiwi Radio is a pirate radio broadcaster transmitting from New Zealand.

Kiwi Radio may also refer to:
KiWi Radio (radio show), a syndicated teen hits radio show
Kiwi FM, a New Zealand radio network
KIWI, a commercial radio station in McFarland, California

See also 
List of radio stations in New Zealand
Radio in New Zealand